Excoecaria dallachyana, the scrub poison tree or brush poison tree, is a species of plant in the spurge family, Euphorbiaceae It is found from the Clarence River, New South Wales to Townsville, Queensland in Australia. The habitat is rainforest by streams or in the drier form of rainforest. The leaves are toxic to livestock and the sap is irritating to human skin. It is a slender tree which may reach  in height.

References

dallachyana
Flora of New South Wales
Flora of Queensland
Trees of Australia
Taxa named by Henri Ernest Baillon
Taxa named by George Bentham